Nizamabad district is a district located in the north-western region in the Indian state of Telangana. The city of Nizamabad is the district headquarters.It was known as " Indur " which was supposed to have originated from the name of the King was Indradatta who seems to have flourished it during the 5th century A.D.The district share boundaries with Jagtial, Sircilla, Nirmal, Kamareddy districts and with Nanded district of the state boundary of Maharashtra.

Etymology 
Nizam stands for Nizam, the governor (of the empire) of Hyderabad State and also  Abad means 'Long Live'. Nizamabad was founded in the year 1905 when Nizam's Dominion were it recognized, where up to it was known as Indur which was supposed to have originated from the name of the King was Indradatta who seems to have flourished it during the 5th century A.D. Later during the 18th century the Nizams ruled over the Deccan region and the district got its name from him.

History 
In October 2016, the districts of Telangana were reorganized and Kamareddy district was carved out of Nizamabad district making it one of the 31 districts of state.

Geography 
Nizamabad is bounded on the North by Nirmal district, on the East by Jagtial and Rajanna Sircilla district, on the South lies Kamareddy district, and on the West by Nanded district of Maharashtra State. The Godavari River enters into Telangana from Nizamabad district at Kandakurthi.

Demographics 

 Census of India, the district has a population of 1,577,108. Scheduled Castes and Scheduled Tribes make up 13.01% and 7.04% of the population respectively.

In 2006, the Indian government named Nizāmābād one of the country's 250 most backward districts (out of a total of 640). It is one of the ten districts of Telangana currently receiving funds from the Backward Regions Grant Fund Programme (BRGF).

In Nizamabad, male literacy is around 92.07% whilst the female literacy rate is 86.03%.

At the time of the 2011 census, 71.62% of the population spoke Telugu, 18.21% Urdu, 5.65% Lambadi and 2.16% Marathi as their first language.

Administrative divisions 

The district is divided into 3 revenue divisions of Bodhan, Armoor and Nizamabad. These are sub-divided into 33 mandals and has 530 villages. C.Narayana Reddy is the present collector of the district.

Mandals 

The below table categorizes 29 mandals into their respective revenue divisions in the district:

Mandals

Constituencies 
Parliamentary Constituency
 Nizamabad Lok Sabhha Constituency

 Assembly Constituencies

There are 6 assembly constituencies in the district. They are, Armur, Bodhan, Banswada – Partly (Varni, Chandur, Mosra, Rudrur, Pothangal and Kotagiri Mandals), Nizamabad (Urban), Nizamabad (Rural), Balkonda

Transport

Roads 
Nizamabad district has good road connectivity. Almost all the towns and villages in the district have well laid asphalt roads and are connected to district headquarters. Nizamabad has 2 National Highways passing through it, one being NH 44 which connects Kanyakumari and Varanasi and the other is NH16 which starts from Nizamabad and passes through Karimnagar to Jagadalpur in the state of Chhattisgarh.
The Telangana State Road Transport Corporation (TSRTC) runs around 700 buses from district headquarters on a daily basis.

Rail 
Nizamabad railway station is the major train station in the district which is located on Secunderabad–Manmad line of Hyderabad Division of the South Central Railway Zone (SCR). All the towns in the district have a rail network coverage and Nizamabad being one of the important stations on the line carters the need of the people. Jankampet Junction which lies in the west of Nizamabad city connects to Bodhan town.

The Nizamabad–Peddapalli section connects Nizamabad with the Grand Trunk route of New Delhi–Chennai main line and the distance from Nizamabad to Karimnagar and Warangal reduced to a large extent. This line also increased the railway network in the district and the northern cities of Telangana.

Airway 
Nizamabad currently doesn't have its own aerodrome however the state government of Telangana has proposed an airport at Jakranpalli in Nizamabad. The nearest international facility is Rajiv Gandhi International Airport in Hyderabad located at a distance of 200 km, and a partly functional domestic airport is Shri Guru Gobind Singh Ji Airport located at 110 km in Nanded of Maharashtra State. The city houses 5 Helipads located each at Nagaram Stadium, Parade Grounds, Dichpally and two at GG College.

Education 

Many engineering colleges are located in the district. Kshatriya College of Engineering, Armoor (KCEA) Vijay Rural Engineering College (VREC), affiliated with Jawaharlal Nehru Technological University, Hyderabad (JNTUH) is the reputed engineering college located in Telangana. Kakatiya Institutions of Nizamabad is a group of institutions known for their excellence in state of Telangana and the erstwhile Andhra Pradesh.

Telangana University is a public university under the government of AP, located at Dichpally, 15 km from the city.
There are many educational institutions that provide education namely VREC, Arkay College of Engineering and Technology, Kshatriya College of Engineering, Kakatiya Engineering College for Women, Government Medical College, Nishitha Degree College, etc.

RGUKT, Basar popularly known as IIIT Basar is an autonomous institution located 35 km from Nizamabad. The official name of the institute is Rajiv Gandhi University of Knowledge Technologies. It offers six-year integrated BTech programme with three semesters every year for those passing SSC, for award of dual degrees in different specializations of engineering and science.

Tourism 

Pocharam Wildlife Sanctuary is a forest and wildlife sanctuary spread across , between the districts of Nizamabad and Medak. It was a former hunting ground of the Nizam that was declared a wildlife sanctuary in the early 20th century.
Alisagar is 10 km (6.2 mi) from Nizamabad city and 2 km (1.2 mi) off the Nizamabad–Bodhan road.

Notable people 
For people from Nizamabad city, not the surrounding district, please see Nizamabad

 Malavath Purna, a 13-year-old student from Sirkonda mandal, Nizamabad district became the youngest person to climb Mount Everest when she reached the peak on 25 May 2014. She was accompanied by Sadanapalli Anand, a 17-year-old student from Khammam.
 Dil Raju is a Telugu cinema film-producer from Narsingpally, in Nizamabad district.

See also 
 Nizamabad Police Commissionerate
 Gadepalli
 Surbiryal

References

External links 

 Official site

 
Nizamabad, Telangana
Districts of Telangana